SIGWEB is a Special Interest Group of the Association for Computing Machinery on Hypertext, Hypermedia, and Web. SIGWEB was named SIGLINK until November 1998.

Conferences
SIGWEB sponsors several conferences relating to hypertext and the World Wide Web.

 The ACM Conference on Hypertext and Social Media (Hypertext)
 The Web Conference
 The ACM Document Engineering Conference (DocEng)
 The ACM/ Web Science Conference (WebSci)
 The ACM/ International Conference on User Modeling, Adaptation, and Personalization (UMAP)
 The ACM/ Conference on Information and Knowledge Management (CIKM)
 The ACM/IEEE Joint Conference on Digital Libraries (JCDL)
 The ACM/ International Conference on Web Search and Datamining (WSDM)

Awards
SIGWEB has three main awards that are given out annually: the Douglas Engelbart Best Paper Award, the Ted Nelson Newcomer Award, and the Vannevar Bush Best Paper Award.

References

External links
 http://www.sigweb.org
 https://www.acm.org/special-interest-groups/sigs/sigweb

Association for Computing Machinery Special Interest Groups